Tronka may refer to:

Tronka, Trondheim,  asylum building
Tronka (novel) (The Sheep's Bell), Ukrainian-language novel by Oles Honchar 1963